This is a list of people (real or fictional) appearing on the cover of Rolling Stone magazine in the 1970s. This list is for the regular biweekly issues of the magazine, including variant covers, and does not include special issues. Issue numbers that include a slash (XXX/YYY) are combined double issues.

1970

1971

1972

1973

1974

1975

1976

1977

1978

1979

Sources
 Rolling Stone Coverwall 1967-2013
 Rolling Stone: 1,000 Covers: A History of the Most Influential Magazine in Pop Culture, New York, NY: Abrams, 2006. 

Lists of actors
Lists of entertainers
Lists of musicians
1970s